Anthela guenei is a moth of the Anthelidae family. It was described by Newman in 1856. It is found in Australia.

References

Moths described in 1856
Anthelidae